is a passenger railway station located in the village of Tōkai, Ibaraki Prefecture, Japan, operated by the East Japan Railway Company (JR East).

Lines
Tōkai Station is served by the Jōban Line, and is located 130.0 km from the official starting point of the line at Nippori Station.

Station layout
The station consists of one side platform and one island platform connected to the station building by an overhead passageway. The station has a Midori no Madoguchi staffed ticket office.

Platforms

History
The station was renamed to its present name on 1 April 1957. The station was absorbed into the JR East network upon the privatization of the Japanese National Railways (JNR) on 1 April 1987. A new station building was completed in July 1994.

Passenger statistics
In fiscal 2019, the station was used by an average of 5055 passengers daily (boarding passengers only).

Surrounding area
 Tōkai Village Hall
 Tōkai Post Office

See also
 List of railway stations in Japan

References

External links

  Station information JR East Station Information 

Railway stations in Ibaraki Prefecture
Jōban Line
Railway stations in Japan opened in 1898
Tōkai, Ibaraki